Semioptila psalidoprocne is a moth in the Himantopteridae family. It was described by Sergius G. Kiriakoff in 1954. It is found in the Democratic Republic of the Congo.

References

Moths described in 1954
Himantopteridae
Endemic fauna of the Democratic Republic of the Congo